Mikael Björqvist (born 28 August 1972) is a Swedish former professional footballer who played as a defender for Västra Frölunda and Örgryte IS in the Allsvenskan.

References

1972 births
Living people
Swedish footballers
Västra Frölunda IF players
Örgryte IS players
Allsvenskan players
Association football defenders